TheFork Australia (formerly known as Dimmi) is an online restaurant reservation platform founded in 2009 by Australian entrepreneur Stevan Premutico.

The company provides a cloud-based reservation service to over 4,500 restaurants across Australia. Reservations can be made by diners online through its website.

Dimmi's restaurant reservation engine, dining portal and online bookings is powered by ResDiary.

History 
The idea behind Dimmi was created by Stevan Premutico on a coffee shop napkin in 2007. "I was sitting in a coffee shop in Chelsea, thinking about how the internet and online was transforming the hotel business, when it dawned on me that the same impact could change the restaurant business", says Premutico.

In May 2015, TheFork, a Tripadvisor company acquired Dimmi for AUD $25 million.

In June 2016, Dimmi announced a new product - Dimmi Off Peak - designed to fill restaurant tables during quiet times by offering diners a discount on select days and times.

In January 2019, Dimmi announced its rebrand to TheFork. Operating as part of the TripAdvisor portfolio, the rebrand will see Dimmi join forces with its European equivalent, TheFork.

References 

Tripadvisor
Internet properties established in 2009
2009 establishments in Australia
Online retailers of Australia
Online food ordering
2015 mergers and acquisitions